Hoffecker-Lockwood House, also known as "Bellevue," was a historic home located at Kenton, Kent County, Delaware.  The house dated to the mid-18th century, and was a two-story, three bay, hall-and-parlor plan brick dwelling.  Attached was a low, two-story, west gable brick wing built part of the original structure and served as a service wing.  The interior featured Georgian-style paneling. Also on the property were a contributing kitchen, smokehouse, barn and stable.

It was listed on the National Register of Historic Places in 1983. It was demolished before 1992.

References

External links

Houses completed in the 18th century
Houses on the National Register of Historic Places in Delaware
Georgian architecture in Delaware
Houses in Kent County, Delaware
Kenton, Delaware
Historic American Buildings Survey in Delaware
National Register of Historic Places in Kent County, Delaware